The non-marine molluscs of Peru are a part of the molluscan fauna of Peru (wildlife of Peru).

A number of species of non-marine molluscs are found in the wild in Peru.

There are 852 species of gastropods (89 species of freshwater gastropods, 763 species of land gastropods) and 40 species of freshwater bivalves living in the wild.

There is altogether 129 species of freshwater molluscs in Peru.

Freshwater gastropods 
Freshwater gastropods include:

Ampullariidae
 Pomacea haustrum (Reeve, 1856)

Planorbidae
 Biomphalaria andecola (Orbigny, 1835)
 Biomphalaria helophila (Orbigny, 1835)
 Biomphalaria peregrina (Orbigny, 1835) - synonym: Biomphalaria pucaraensis (Preston, 1909)
 Biomphalaria tenagophila (Orbigny, 1835)
 Drepanotrema kermatoides (Orbigny, 1835)
 Drepanotrema limayanum (Lesson, 1830)
 Helisoma trivolvis (Say, 1817)
 Helisoma duryi (Wetherby, 1879)

Lymnaeidae
 Lymnaea viatrix Orbigny, 1835

Physidae
 Physa acuta Draparnaud, 1801
 seemingly Physa peruviana Gray, 1828

Land gastropods 

There are other 30 genera of land gastropods, than mentioned below next to families, with 56 species.

Helicinidae - 2 genera, 25 species
 ...

Neocyclotidae - 4 genera, 20 species
 ...

Orthalicidae - without Bulimulinae has 4 genera and 18 species in Peru.
 ...

Orthalicidae, Bulimulinae - only Bulimulinae has 15 genera, 424 species in Peru
 ...

Veronicellidae
 Colosius pulcher (Colosi 1921)
 Heterovaginina limayana (Lesson 1830)
 Latipes lisei Thomé & Gomes 1999
 Montivaginulus coriaceus (Kraus 1954)
 Novovaginula carinata (Thiele 1927)
 Novovaginula rosaneae Thomé & Gomes 1999
 Phyllocaulis gayi (Fischer 1871)
 Sarasinula marginata (Semper, 1885)

Subulinidae - 5 genera, 19 species
 Leptinaria unilamellata (d’Orbigny, 1837)

Clausiliidae - 14 genera, 75 species
 ...

Scolodontidae - 8 genera, 55 species
 ...

Charopidae - 3 genera, 13 species
 ...

Pleurodontidae - 2 genera, 13 species
 ...

Camaenidae - 2 genera, 12 species
 ...

Helminthoglyptidae - 2 genera, 33 species
 ...

Freshwater bivalves
Freshwater bivalves include:

Hyriidae

 Callonaia duprei (Recluz, 1843)
 Castalia ambigua Lamarck, 1819 - Castalia ambigua ambigua Lamarck, 1819
 Castalia multisulcata Hupé, 1857
 Castalia schombergiana Sowerby, 1869
 Castalia sulcata - Castalia sulcata orbygnyi Hupé & Deville, 1850
 Diplodon limensis (Kust-Chemnitz, 1851)
 Diplodon obsolescens Baker, 1914
 Diplodon suavidicus (Lea, 1856)
 Diplodontites cookei Kust & Chemnitz, 1851
 Paxyodon syrmathophorus Meuschen, 1781
 Prisodon obliquus Schumacher, 1817
 Triplodon corrugatus (Lamarck, 1819)

Mycetopodidae

 Anodonta solidula Lamarck, 1819
 Anodonta subsinuata Phillippi, 1869
 Anodonta subrostrata Phillippi, 1869
 Anodonta ucayalensis Phillippi, 1869
 Anodontites elongatus (Swainson, 1823)
 Anodontites ensiformis (Spix & Wagner, 1827)
 Anodontites incarum (Philippi, 1869)
 Anodontites tenebricosa (Lea, 1834)
 Anodontites trapesialis (Lamarck, 1819) - Anodontites trapesialis trapesialis (Lamarck, 1819)
 Anodontites trapezeus (Spix, 1827)
 Anodontites trigonus (Spix, 1827) - Anodontites trigonus trigonus (Spix, 1827)
 Anodontites weirauchi Hass, 1930
 Iheringiella sp.
 Leila blainvilliana (Lea, 1834)
 Leila esula (Orbigny, 1835)
 Monocondylaea semisulcata Adams, 1870
 Mycetopoda siliquosa Spix, 1827
 Mycetopoda soleniformis Orbigny, 1835
 Mycetopodella falcata (Higgins, 1868)
 Tamsiella sp.

Etheriidae
 Barlettia stefanensis (Moricand, 1856)

Sphaeriidae
 Eupera simoni Jousseaume, 1889
 Eupera primei Klappenbach, 1967
 Pisidium meierbrooki Kuiper & Hinz, 1983
 Sphaerium forbesii Philippi, 1869
 Sphaerium lauricocheae Philippi, 1870
 Sphaerium titicacence (Pilsbry, 1924)

Corbiculidae
 Corbicula sp.

See also
 List of marine molluscs of Peru

Lists of molluscs of surrounding countries:
 List of non-marine molluscs of Ecuador, Wildlife of Ecuador
 List of non-marine molluscs of Colombia, Wildlife of Colombia
 List of non-marine molluscs of Brazil, Wildlife of Brazil
 List of non-marine molluscs of Bolivia, Wildlife of Bolivia
 List of non-marine molluscs of Chile, Wildlife of Chile

References

External links
 Paredes C., Huamán P., Cardoso F., Vivar R. & Vera V. (1999). "Estado actual del conocimiento de los moluscos acuáticos en el Perú". Revista Peruana de Biología 6(1): 5-47. .

Moll
Peru
Molluscs
Peru
Peru
Peru